The Canon of the Netherlands (also known as the Canon of Dutch History) is a list of fifty topics that aims to provide a chronological summary of Dutch history to be taught in primary schools and  the first two years of secondary school in the Netherlands.  The fifty topics are divided into fourteen sections.

Canon 
The Canon of Dutch History was prepared by a committee headed by Frits van Oostrom and presented to the Minister of Education, Culture and Science, Maria van der Hoeven, on 16 October 2006.

A revised version was presented to the Dutch government on 3 October 2007 and in October 2008 it was agreed to include the canon in the school curriculum by 1 August 2009. An updated version was presented in June 2020, with ten topics replaced, parts rewritten and other modifications made to make the canon more diverse and accessible.

The canon was designed to provide an overview of "what everyone ought to know, at the very least, about the history and culture of the Netherlands",  as well as providing a framework for the teaching of History in Dutch schools. Schools are not obliged to teach the canon, in accordance with the Freedom of education principle incorporated in the Dutch constitution (article 23) that guarantees the right of parents to have their children educated in accordance with their religious and other views.

The website entoen.nu is responsible for developing the canon for use in schools and in society in general.

The 14 sections 
 The Low Countries by the Sea
 On the outer edges of Europe
 Conversion to Christianity
 The Dutch language
 An urban center and trading centre at the confluence of the Rhine, the Meuse and the Scheldt rivers
 The Dutch Republic emerges from an uprising
The flowering of the Golden Age
 A trading nation and colonial power
 A nation-state under a constitutional monarchy
 The rise of modern society
 The Netherlands during the time of the world wars from 1914 to 1945
The welfare state, democratisation and secularisation
 The diversification of the Netherlands
 The Netherlands in Europe

The 50 topics

Members of the Committee 
 Frits van Oostrom (professor of Humanities at the University of Utrecht, President of the Royal Netherlands Academy of Arts and Sciences, Spinoza Prize 1995, AKO Literatuurprijs 1996), chairperson
 Paul van Meenen (leader of the Democrats 66 (D66) party in Leiden, vice chairperson of entoen.nu), vice chairperson	
 Herman Beliën (senior lecturer in the Faculty of Humanities at the  University of Amsterdam)
 Marjolijn Drenth (philosopher, novelist, columnist for de Volkskrant)
 Frans Groot (history teacher at the Amsterdam University of Applied Science)
 Els Kloek (history teacher and senior researcher in the Faculty of Arts at the University of Utrecht, project leader of the Online Women's Dictionary of the Netherlands)
 Susan Legêne (professor of political history at the Vrije Universiteit of Amsterdam, formerly curator of the Tropenmuseum in Amsterdam)
 Rob van der Vaart (Professor in Human Geography at the University of Utrecht)
 Hubert Slings (director of entoen.nu, director of education at the Dutch National Museum of History), secretary

See also
 Canon of Dutch Literature
 
 Canon of Friesland
 
 Canon of Groningen
 
 
 
 Canon of Curaçao

References

External links 
  (English)
 
 
 

Dutch history timelines
Historiography of the Netherlands